The Beautiful Adventure (French: La Belle aventure) is a 1942 French romantic comedy film directed by Marc Allégret and starring Claude Dauphin, Micheline Presle and Louis Jourdan. It is based on 1913 play of the same name by Gaston Arman de Caillavet, Robert de Flers and Étienne Rey.

The film's sets were designed by the art director Paul Bertrand.

Plot
On her wedding day, a young bride takes off with her cousin, who she has always loved.

Cast
 Claude Dauphin as Valentin Le Barroyer
 Micheline Presle as Françoise Pimbrache
 Louis Jourdan as André d'Éguzon
 Gisèle Pascal as Hélène de Trévillac
 Suzanne Dehelly as Madame d'Éguzon
 André Brunot as Le comte d'Éguzon
 Berthe Bovy as Madame de Trévillac
 Aquistapace as L'oncle
 Pauline Carton as Jeantine
 Géo Dorlys as Fouque
 Danièle Girard as Monique

Production
The film was shot in September–October 1942 in Nice. However it was not released until after the Liberation of France due to the ban on the films of Claude Dauphin after he joined the Free French.

See also
The Beautiful Adventure (1917)
The Beautiful Adventure (1932, German)
The Beautiful Adventure (1932, French)

References

External links
La Belle aventure at IMDb

1942 films
Films directed by Marc Allégret
French black-and-white films
Films scored by Georges Auric
French films based on plays
French romantic comedy films
1942 romantic comedy films
1940s French-language films
1940s French films